was a Japanese screenwriter particularly known for his work in the yakuza film genre. He was born in the Nihonbashi area of Tokyo and dropped out of Nippon University.

Works
Battles Without Honor and Humanity (1973)
Battles Without Honor and Humanity: Deadly Fight in Hiroshima (1973)
Battles Without Honor and Humanity: Proxy War (1974)
Battles Without Honor and Humanity: Police Tactics (1974)
Cops vs. Thugs (1975)
Yakuza Graveyard (1976)
The Battle of Port Arthur (1980)
Final Yamato (1983)
Odin: Photon Sailer Starlight (1985)

See also
Kinji Fukasaku
Haruhiko Arai - a screenwriter and a movie critic who wrote 'Dramas of Showa' (published from Ohta Publishing) about Kasahara with  Kasahara.

References

External links

1927 births
2002 deaths
20th-century Japanese screenwriters